Baba Hassan was a Dey of Algiers, from 1682 to 1683.

As the Dey of Algiers 
He assumed control after Mohammed Trik, the previous dey, and an elderly Corsair left politics, and gave the title of Dey to him in 1677. He was officially announced as ruler in 1682. He waged war against France, but after the Bombardment of Algiers in 1683, he was forced to capitulate. The Diwan of Algiers did not accept this decision. Another rais called Mezzo Morto Hüseyin Pasha killed him in the Palace of Jenina, taking away powers from him, and assuming the role of dey.

References

Sources
 

Deys of Algiers